Pedro 'Pere' Tarradellas Cámara (born 25 November 1979) is a Spanish retired footballer who played as a left winger.

Football career
Born in Mollet del Vallès, Barcelona, Catalonia, Tarradellas started playing as a senior with local EC Granollers. He later represented teams in his native region, playing for AEC Manlleu, UE Figueres, RCD Espanyol B, CE Mataró and UE Lleida.

On 31 August 2004, Tarradellas signed for SD Ponferradina, appearing regularly for the Castile and León team in his only season, which finished in promotion. He moved to CF Badalona in the 2005 summer, and was an ever-present figure over the course of three campaigns.

In July 2009, Tarradellas joined UE Sant Andreu, after a short spell at neighbouring CF Gavà. Again a regular, he scored a career-best nine goals in 2009–10.

In August 2011, Tarradellas moved to fellow league team UE Llagostera, achieving promotion to Segunda División (the club's first ever) at the end of the 2013–14 campaign. On 23 August 2014, aged 34, he made his debut as a professional, starting in a 0–2 away loss against UD Las Palmas.

On 8 June 2015, after appearing in 14 matches during the campaign, Tarradellas announced his retirement.

References

External links

1979 births
Living people
People from Vallès Oriental
Sportspeople from the Province of Barcelona
Spanish footballers
Footballers from Catalonia
Association football wingers
Segunda División players
Segunda División B players
Tercera División players
AEC Manlleu footballers
UE Figueres footballers
RCD Espanyol B footballers
CE Mataró players
UE Lleida players
SD Ponferradina players
CF Badalona players
CF Gavà players
UE Sant Andreu footballers
UE Costa Brava players